Misrimal Navajee Munoth Jain Engineering College (MNMJEC or MNM) is an engineering college located within the Chennai city limits along the National IT Highway on the Old Mahabalipuram Road.

History
The College was started in the year 1994, with the primary objective of providing higher education to Jain students. However, others were and are also admitted without reference to caste or religion. The main objective of this college is "No donation and no capitation".The college is under TEAM Trust
The Tamil Nadu Educational and Medical Trust (TEAM Trust) was founded in 1972 with a view to provide high quality Technical and Medical Education in Tamil Nadu.

Under Graduate Courses 
B.E. Civil Engineering
B.E. Mechanical Engineering
B.E. Electrical & Electronics Engineering
B.E. Electronics & Communication Engineering
B.E. Computer Science Engineering
B.Tech. Information Technology

Post Graduate Courses
M.E. Computer Science Engineering (CSE)
M.E. Structural Engineering (Civil)
Master of Business Administration

Research Courses
Ph.D. Computer Science Engineering (CSE)

Facilities
 Library    
 Transportation Bus
 Hostel       
 Medical center
 Banking         
 Mess             
 Canteen        
 Exams          
 Play Ground    
 Sports          

Student Welfare
 Cultural Association
 NSS
 Rotaract Club
 Leo Club

External links
 

All India Council for Technical Education
Engineering colleges in Chennai
Jain universities and colleges